Sharphydrus is a genus of beetles in the family Dytiscidae, containing the following species:

 Sharphydrus capensis (Omer-Cooper, 1955)
 Sharphydrus coriaceus (Régimbart, 1894)

References

Dytiscidae